The Stefanos Pnevmatikos International Award is an award of the Foundation for Research & Technology – Hellas (FORTH) that was founded in 1991 and first awarded in 1992. It is named in honor of Stefanos Pnevmatikos, a researcher of nonlinear physics. The award is presented every two years to young researchers of nonlinear physics, mathematical physics, or nonlinear disordered systems. The award is coordinated by the University of Crete Department of Physics and is sponsored by the Foundation for Research & Technology – Hellas. The committee is headed by George P. Tsironis and includes Alan R. Bishop, Michel Peyrard, Serge Aubry, David Kelly Campbell, Vladimir E. Zakharov, and formerly included Arnold Kosevich and Alwyn Scott. The award has been suspended due to the Greek government-debt crisis.

Recipients
The award has been given to the following people.

2008: Panayotis G. Kevrekidis
2006: Tsampikos Kottos
2004: Peter Hamm
2002: Sergej Flach
2000: Raymond E. Goldstein
1998: Alexey Ustinov
1996: George P. Tsironis
1994: Yuri Kivshar
1992: Robert Sinclair MacKay

References

Awards established in 1992